The 2015 Stan Wawrinka tennis season began at the Chennai Open, where he won the title for the third time in his career. This was followed by an unsuccessful defense of his title at the Australian Open, where he lost in the semi-finals to eventual champion Novak Djokovic in five sets. A few months later, after a relatively unsuccessful clay season, Stan won his second major title at the French Open, defeating Roger Federer and Novak Djokovic in the process.

Year summary

Australian Open and early hard court season

Chennai Open
Wawrinka opened his season for the seventh consecutive year in Chennai, where he was the defending champion. After a bye in the first round he easily beat Borna Ćorić, Gilles Müller and David Goffin in the semifinal before defeating Aljaz Bedene in the final to have his first singles title defense of his career.

Australian Open
Wawrinka entered the first Grand Slam of the year as the fourth seed and was the defending champion. He opened his campaign with ease, recording straight sets wins against Marsel İlhan, Marius Copil and Jarkko Nieminen. In the fourth round Wawrinka lost the first set against the Spanish Guillermo García-López but won the match in the fourth set in a tiebreak. The Swiss then avenged his US Open loss Kei Nishikori, defeating him in the quarter finals in straight sets. At the semi final, his title defense came to an end after being beaten by eventual champion Novak Djokovic in five sets.

Rotterdam
Wawrinka played his first ATP World Tour 500 level and indoor tournament of the year in Rotterdam, first beating Jesse Huta Galung after being a set down. He then beat Garcia-Lopez in three sets, then beat Gilles Müller in straights. In the semifinals, he beat Milos Raonic in two tiebreaks, making his second Top 10 win of the season. At the final, he beat Tomáš Berdych from a set down, winning his first 500 level, and first indoor title of his career.

Marseille
Wawrinka continued his indoor play in Marseille, where he first beat wildcard Benoît Paire in straight sets. His run of wins came to an end however, losing to Sergiy Stakhovsky after being a set up.

Indian Wells Masters
Wawrinka played at Indian Wells Masters as the seventh seed. After a first round bye, he lost to Robin Haase in three sets in the second round. This was the first loss in his career against the Dutch after six wins of the Swiss.

Miami Open
Wawrinka defeated in the second round Carlos Berlocq in a three set match, but he was beat by Adrian Mannarino in the next round in three sets.

Spring clay court season and French Open

Monte-Carlo Masters
Wawrinka began his clay season in Monte-Carlo where he was the defending champion. He faced Juan Mónaco as his first opponent and defeated him in straight sets. However, he lost against Grigor Dimitrov in the next round, receiving his worst loss of his career, winning only a total of 3 games. After his loss, he publicly announced on Facebook about his separation with his wife, Ilham.

Madrid
Wawrinka first defeated João Sousa in straight sets, but was defeated again by Dimitrov in the next round, this time losing in three sets.

Rome
After a slump that started since Indian Wells, Wawrinka started to show some form again after beating Monaco in his first match after being down a set and a break, and having break points against him for a double break. He then reached another ATP World Tour Masters 1000 quarterfinal after beating Dominic Thiem in straights, his first since Cincinnati the year before. At the quarterfinal, he defeated Rafael Nadal for the first time on clay, beating him in straight sets for the first time in his career, after being down multiple set points in the first-set tiebreaker. He then faced fellow Swiss Roger Federer in the semifinal, where he was defeated in straights after being a break up in the first set.

Geneva
Wawrinka continued his preparation for the French Open by playing in the inaugural Geneva Open, where he beat qualifier Lukáš Rosol in three sets. He then lost in the quarterfinals against Federico Delbonis after being a set up.

French Open
Wawrinka started his 2015 French Open campaign, first beating İlhan. He then followed it up by beating Dušan Lajović, only dropping the third set. He then beat Steve Johnson, then beat Gilles Simon, both in straight sets. At the quarterfinal, he again faced Federer in a rematch of Rome this year, where Wawrinka turned the tables against his fellow Swiss, incurring Wawrinka's first win against Federer in a Grand Slam. This win meant that Wawrinka had finally beaten each of the Big Four in a major at least one time, and it also has brought Federer's first defeat in a major without breaking his opponent's serve, and also brings Wawrinka's first French Open semifinal. At the semifinal, he faced Jo-Wilfried Tsonga, where after winning a comfortable first set, he dropped the second after being a break up. At the third set, Wawrinka prevailed in the tiebreak after being down multiple break points in the set. He then won the match winning the fourth set, beating the Frenchman and advancing to his first French Open final, his second major final overall. At the final, he faced Djokovic, where he lost the first set. However, he was able to come back in the second set after being break points down in the first game. He was also able to win the third set comfortably. At the fourth set however, he lost the first three games. Wawrinka eventually was able to come back in the set, and had break points on the seventh game. Djokovic managed to save them all however, and had Wawrinka at 0–40 in the eight game, but managed to save them all. He finally broke Djokovic in the ninth game, and won the match after serving it out in the game after. With this win, he won his first French Open title, improved his major final record to 2–0, and won his second major title of his career.

Grass court season and Wimbledon

Queen's Club
Wawrinka started his grass court season campaign by playing the 2015 Aegon Championships on Queen's Club in London, where he first beat last year's Wimbledon quarterfinalist Nick Kyrgios in straights. However, he was then beaten by eventual finalist Kevin Anderson in two tight tiebreak sets, making it his fourth consecutive loss against the South African.

Wimbledon
Wawrinka continued his major win streak by defeating Sousa, Víctor Estrella Burgos, Fernando Verdasco and David Goffin in the first four rounds, all in straight sets. At the quarterfinal, however, he was beaten by Richard Gasquet after having a 2-1 set lead.

US Open series

Montreal
He started his US Open preparation by playing in the 2015 Rogers Cup. He lost to Kyrgios after being a set up, where Wawrinka retired at the third set. During the match, Kyrgios made offending comments against Wawrinka, where after knowing about it after match, Wawrinka demanded Kyrgios an apology to those all concerned in the incident.

Cincinnati
Wawrinka played at the 2015 Western & Southern Open in Cincinnati, where he first faced Borna Ćorić, defeating him from a set down. He then faced another Croatian in Ivo Karlović, where he won in three tiebreak sets. In a rematch of the French Open final, he faced Djokovic again, but this time in a Masters quarterfinal, where Djokovic prevailed losing only 5 games.

US Open
At the third major of the year, Wawrinka started his 2015 US Open campaign by first beating Albert Ramos in straight sets. He then faced young South Korean player Chung Hyeon, where he needed three tiebreak sets to win it. He then defeated Ruben Bemelmans, in straight sets again, but then dropped his first set of the tournament, against Donald Young. He eventually prevailed in four sets, where he next faced Anderson, and finally snapeds the four match losing streak against the South African, winning in straight sets and the third set without losing a game. At the semifinal, he faced Federer again, where he lost in straights.

Davis Cup play-offs, Asian swing, and the indoor season

Davis Cup World Group play-offs
Wawrinka represented Switzerland in the 2015 Davis Cup World Group play-offs, facing against Dutchman Thiemo de Bakker in the first singles rubber. After being 1-2 sets down, Warwinka was able to come back and win the next two sets to win the match. Switzerland eventually won the tie at the fourth rubber.

Metz
Wawrinka started the indoor season at the 2015 Moselle Open, where he defeated Dustin Brown in three sets. However, Wawrinka gave a walkover on the quarterfinal against Philipp Kohlschreiber.

Tokyo
Wawrinka started the Asian swing by playing at the 2015 Rakuten Japan Open Tennis Championships in Tokyo, where he first beat Radek Štěpánek in straights, his first straight sets win in a three-setter since his win against Kyrgios in Queen's Club. He then avenged his loss against Tatsuma Ito the year before, by beating him this time in three sets. Wawrinka then faced qualifier Austin Krajicek in the quarterfinals, defeating him in straight sets. At the semifinal, he faced Muller again, again winning in straight sets, with a second-set tiebreaker. He faced his close friend Paire again, but this time in a final for the first time. Wawrinka won the match for the championship, winning it in straight sets, giving Wawrinka his first Tokyo title, and his second 500 level tournament title of the year and his career.

Shanghai
Wawrinka continued the Asian swing by participating in the 2015 Shanghai Rolex Masters, where he first beat Viktor Troicki in straights. He then faced Marin Čilić, winning in a tight three setter. His run came to an end when he faced Nadal again at a Masters quarterfinal, this time Wawrinka only winning three games during the match.

Basel
After the Asian swing, Wawrinka continued his indoor season in the 2015 Swiss Indoors in Basel. He lost against Karlović this time in three sets however, after he won the first set.

Paris
Wawrinka played at the 2015 BNP Paribas Masters in Paris, the final ATP World Tour Masters 1000 tournament of the year. He first defeated Bernard Tomic in straight sets, then beat Troicki again in straight sets. He again faced Nadal in the quarterfinal, but this time he won in two very tight tiebreak sets. Wawrinka then faced Djokovic, where after being a set a break down, was able to win the second set, giving Djokovic his first set loss since the US Open final. However, Wawrinka  wasn't able to carry this momentum, as he didn't win any games in the third set, ending his run this year in the Masters.

ATP World Tour Finals
Wawrinka qualified for the third straight time in the ATP World Tour Finals, and is the fourth seed at the event. He was put in the Ilie Năstase Group. At the first rubber, he lost against Nadal in straights only winning five games. At the second rubber, he won against Ferrer in straights. At the third rubber, he faced Andy Murray for the first time since their last meeting at the 2013 US Open quarterfinals, where the winner of this rubber would be guaranteed a place in the semifinal after placing second in the group, facing Federer. Wawrinka won the match in straight sets, advancing him to his third straight semifinal at the year-end championships. He rematched Federer in the semifinal, this time losing in straight sets.

All matches
This table chronicles all the matches of Stanislas Wawrinka in 2015, including walkovers (W/O) which the ATP does not count as wins. They are marked ND for non-decision or no decision.

Singles matches

Doubles matches

Tournament Schedule

Singles schedule

Yearly records

Head-to-head matchups
Stan Wawrinka had a  match win–loss record in the 2015 season. Bold indicates player was ranked top 10 at time of meeting. The following list is ordered by number of wins:

 Gilles Müller 3–0
 Borna Ćorić 2–0
 Marsel İlhan 2–0
 Guillermo García-López 2–0
 David Goffin 2–0
 Juan Mónaco 2–0
 Benoît Paire 2–0
 João Sousa 2–0
 Viktor Troicki 2–0
 Rafael Nadal 2–2
 Thiemo de Bakker 1–0
 Aljaž Bedene 1–0
 Ruben Bemelmans 1–0
 Tomáš Berdych 1–0
 Carlos Berlocq 1–0
 Dustin Brown 1–0
 Marin Čilić 1–0
 Marius Copil 1–0
 David Ferrer 1–0
 Chung Hyeon 1–0
 Jesse Huta Galung 1–0
 Steve Johnson 1–0
 Austin Krajicek 1–0
 Tatsuma Ito 1–0
 Dušan Lajović 1–0
 Andy Murray 1–0
 Jarkko Nieminen 1–0
 Kei Nishikori 1–0
 Albert Ramos 1–0
 Milos Raonic 1–0
 Lukáš Rosol 1–0
 Gilles Simon 1–0
 Radek Štěpánek 1–0
 Bernard Tomić 1–0
 Dominic Thiem 1–0
 Jo-Wilfried Tsonga 1–0
 Víctor Estrella Burgos 1–0
 Fernando Verdasco 1–0
 Donald Young 1–0
 Kevin Anderson 1–1
 Ivo Karlović 1–1
 Nick Kyrgios 1–1
 Novak Djokovic 1–3
 Roger Federer 1–3
 Richard Gasquet 0–1
 Federico Delbonis 0–1
 Robin Haase 0–1
 Adrian Mannarino 0–1
 Sergiy Stakhovsky 0–1
 Grigor Dimitrov 0–2

Finals

Singles: 4 (4–0)

Earnings

 Figures in United States dollars (USD) unless noted.

See also
 2015 ATP World Tour
 2015 Roger Federer tennis season
 2015 Rafael Nadal tennis season
 2015 Novak Djokovic tennis season
 2015 Andy Murray tennis season

External links
2015 Schedule at ATP World Tour

Wawrinka
Wawrinka
2015 in Swiss tennis
2015 in Swiss sport